J Mood is an album by Wynton Marsalis that won the Grammy Award for Best Instrumental Jazz Performance, Individual or Group in 1987.

Critical reception 
In a review for Playboy, Robert Christgau said that Marsalis is "chief among the younger players who eschew expressionistic excess in favor of technical command and respect for history", and that J Mood "isn't as staid as you might think, holding subtle pleasures to spare for those with time to spare".  The Penguin Guide to Jazz Recordings lists the album as part of its suggested “core collection” of essential recordings.

Track listing

Personnel
 Wynton Marsalis – trumpet
 Marcus Roberts – piano
 Robert Hurst III – double bass
 Jeff "Tain" Watts – drums

References

1986 albums
Columbia Records albums
Wynton Marsalis albums
Grammy Award for Best Jazz Instrumental Album
Albums produced by George Butler (record producer)